Cardinal O'Hara High School  is a coeducational Catholic high school of the Archdiocese of Philadelphia.  The school is named after John Francis O'Hara who was Roman Catholic Archbishop of Philadelphia from 1951 to 1960. It is located in Springfield, Pennsylvania and was officially opened for the first time in 1930.

History

In 2018 the O'Hara campus began temporarily housing students from Our Lady of the Angels Regional School as that campus had experienced a fire.

Administration

Presidents
The position of president was established in 1993 for all archdiocesan high schools. The president is responsible for financial operations, facilities issues, fund raising, alumni relations, and external affairs.

 1993-2001: Rev. Joseph P. McFadden
 2001-2014: Dr. William J. McCusker
 2014-2017: Mr. Thomas Fertal
 2017-2020: Mr. Gerald DeFruscio
 2021-present times: Mr. Mike Connor

Principals
Since the establishment of the position of President in 1993, the principal's duties are concentrated on the day-to-day operations of the school.

 1963-1969: Rev. Paul P. Maloney
 1969-1971: Rev. Joseph C. McCloskey
 1971-1980: Rev. James E. Mortimer
 1980-1988: Rev. Philip J. Cribben
 1988-1993: Rev. Joseph J. McLaughlin
 1993-2001: Dr. William J. McCusker
 2001-2004: Rev. Michael O'Malley
 2004-2007: Mr. William J. Miles
 2007-2010: Mr. George Stratts 
 2010-2013: Mrs. Marie Rogai
 2014-2015: Mr. Peter Balzano
 2015-pres:  Mrs. Eileen Vice

Student life

Athletics

Notable alumni

Sports 

Corey "Philly" Brown, NFL football player
Kristen "Ace" Clement, former NCAA basketball player
Don Clune, former NFL football player
Joey Crawford, retired NBA referee
Tim Donaghy, ex-NBA referee
Gerald Feehery, retired NFL football player
Theresa Grentz, basketball player, member of Women's Basketball Hall of Fame
Anthony Heygood, former NFL football player
Tom Ingelsby, former NBA player
Kevin Jones, NFL football player
Tom Savage, NFL football player, quarterback of Houston Texans
Anthony Walters, NFL football player
Natasha Cloud, WNBA Player for the Washington Mystics

Entertainment/TV/Film 

 Mark Matkevich, stage, film, and television actor and artist

Military /Government/Religious 

Bill Adolph, member of Pennsylvania House of Representatives
Michael Francis Burbidge, Bishop of Arlington, former Bishop of Raleigh
Joe Hackett, member of the Pennsylvania House of Representatives, District 161 from 2011 to 2015
Ronald T. Kadish, retired United States Air Force Lieutenant General
Julia Keleher Secretary of Education in Puerto Rico and writer
Tom Killion, member of Pennsylvania House of Representatives
 Samuel Paparo, 64th commander, United States Pacific Fleet (2021-present)
Joe Sestak, member of US House of Representatives for Pennsylvania's 7th congressional district

See also
 Philadelphia Catholic League
 Roman Catholic Archdiocese of Philadelphia
 Catholic Community Choir (Hosted at Cardinal O’Hara)

References

External links
 School's Website
 Archdiocese of Philadelphia Website

Catholic secondary schools in Pennsylvania
Roman Catholic Archdiocese of Philadelphia
Educational institutions established in 1963
1963 establishments in Pennsylvania
Schools in Delaware County, Pennsylvania
Springfield Township, Delaware County, Pennsylvania